The I.O.O.F. Hall in Alva, Oklahoma, USA, was built in 1905 in Plains Commercial architecture style. It was used historically as a department store and as a clubhouse for the Independent Order of Odd Fellows. It was listed on the National Register of Historic Places in 1984. On the morning of May 22, 2004, fire destroyed the building. Investigators ruled the blaze an accident.

References

Clubhouses on the National Register of Historic Places in Oklahoma
Buildings and structures completed in 1905
Buildings and structures in Woods County, Oklahoma
Odd Fellows buildings in Oklahoma
National Register of Historic Places in Woods County, Oklahoma
1905 establishments in Oklahoma Territory